Conopomorpha litchiella is a moth of the family Gracillariidae. It is known from Australia, China (Fujian), India (Bihar, Uttar Pradesh, Karnataka and West Bengal), Malaysia (Selangor), Nepal, Taiwan and Thailand.

The larvae feed on Senna obtusifolia, Senna tora, Eugenia cumini, Dimocarpus longan, Litchi chinensis, Nephelium litchi and Theobroma cacao. They mine the leaves as well as the fruit of their host plant. After mining the leaves, the larvae migrate to other food plants and return to oviposit (lay eggs) on the fruits. Pupation takes place underneath the leaves in a cocoon.

References

Conopomorpha
Moths of Asia
Moths of Japan
Moths described in 1986